The 1972 United States presidential election in Georgia took place on November 7, 1972, as part of the 1972 United States presidential election. Georgia voters chose 12 representatives, or electors, to the Electoral College, who voted for president and vice president.

Georgia was won by incumbent President Richard Nixon (R–California), with 75.04% of the popular vote, against George McGovern (D–South Dakota), with 24.65% of the popular vote. This made Georgia, even amidst a Republican landslide, 26% more Republican than the nation at-large and made it Nixon's second strongest state in the 1972 election. Although Mississippi was to give Nixon an even larger margin, in the 12 subsequent presidential elections only 1 statewide result – Ronald Reagan’s victory in Utah in 1980 – has provided so large a margin. This is also the best showing in the state by a Republican presidential candidate.

In the South, McGovern was universally viewed as a left-wing extremist because of his support for busing and civil rights, plus his opposition to the Vietnam War, support for granting amnesty to draft dodgers and support for a $1,000 giveaway to each American as a solution to poverty. Many, especially Republican campaigners, also believed McGovern would legalize abortion and illicit drugs if he were elected – despite the fact that his running mate Sargent Shriver was firmly opposed to legalizing abortion.

In a state that would reflect McGovern's national results, the Democratic nominee did not win a single county in Georgia. Despite overwhelming Democratic dominance of the state for over a century, owing to the Republican leanings of several pro-Union North Georgia counties, chiefly Fannin but also Towns and Pickens, this was the first time any candidate had swept every Georgia county. Even more unusual, every county in the state would go on to vote for the Democratic candidate, Jimmy Carter (a Georgia native and former Georgia governor), in the next presidential election.

The 1972 election constitutes the only time Hancock County has not voted Democratic since 1852. It is the last time the following counties have ever voted Republican: Calhoun, Clay, Fulton (which contains the state's largest city, Atlanta), Macon, Stewart, Talbot, Taliaferro, and Warren. 

Georgia would not vote Republican again until Ronald Reagan’s landslide victory in 1984.

Results

Results by county

Notes

References

Georgia
1972
1972 Georgia (U.S. state) elections